The Judicates (or  in Sardinian,  in Latin,  or  in Italian), in English also referred to as Sardinian Kingdoms, Sardinian Judgedoms or Judicatures, were independent states that took power in Sardinia in the Middle Ages, between the ninth and fifteenth centuries. They were sovereign states with summa potestas, each with a ruler called judge ( in Sardinian), with the powers of a king.

Historical causes of the advent of the kingdoms

After a relatively brief Vandal occupation (456–534), Sardinia was a province of the Byzantine Empire from 535 until the eighth century.

After 705, with the rapid Arab expansion, Saracen pirates from North Africa began to raid the island and encountered no effective opposition by the Byzantine army. In 815, Sardinian ambassadors requested military assistance from the Carolingian Emperor Louis the Pious.

In 807, 810–812, and 821–822 the Arabs of Spain and North Africa tried to invade the island but the Sardinians resisted several attacks. With the fall of the Exarchate of Africa, based in Carthage, at the end of the seventh century, and especially with the emergence of the Arab presence in Sicily (827), Sardinia remained disconnected from the core lands of the Byzantine Empire and had, out of necessity, become economically and militarily independent.

The birth of the four kingdoms
The almost total absence of historical sources does not allow certainty surrounding the date of the passage from Byzantine central authority to self-government in Sardinia.

The known medieval giudicati were:

Kingdom of Cagliari with capital in Santa Igia
Kingdom of Arborea with capital in Oristano,
Kingdom of Gallura with capital in Civita,
Kingdom of Torres with capital in Porto Torres, Ardara and then Sassari.

Each of the four States had fortified borders to protect their political and commercial interests, as well their own laws, administration and emblems.

Governments
The administrative organization of the judgedoms differed significantly from the feudal forms existing in the rest of medieval Europe as their institutions were closer to those of the territories of the Byzantine Empire, although with local peculiarities that some scholars consider of Nuragic derivation.

The Corona de Logu and the central council
The central government and the entire Judiciary were ruled substantially by the judge. They appointed the ruler and attributed the supreme power to him, while maintaining the power to ratify acts and agreements related to the entire kingdom.

The judge ruled on the basis of a covenant with the people (the ). The sovereign could be dethroned and even, in cases of serious acts of tyranny and oppression, executed legitimately by the same people, without this prejudging the inheritance of the title within the same ruling dynasty.

Judges

However, that was composed primarily of the nobility's relatives and, therefore, linked by common interests.

The judicial chancellery
In the government of the territory, the Judge was assisted by the Chancellery. The sovereign authority was in fact formalized with the drafting of official acts called  paper, written by the statal chancellor, usually a bishop or at least a senior member of the clergy, assisted by other officials called .

Local administration

Curadorias

Law

The Cartas de Logu are collections of penal, public, civil and land regulations of great importance, in force in the various Giudicati. Unfortunately, only a few parts of the Carta Caralitana have been preserved. The Carta de Logu of the Giudicato of Arborea marks, towards the end of the fourteenth century, the birth of a rule of law by Mariano IV first and then by his daughter Eleonora, who extended the scope of the rules to adapt them to a changed reality in social conditions. The Chart is written in Sardinian (of the Logudorese variety) and from this we can deduce the judicial intent to actually make it known to citizens in order to make them aware of lawful and unlawful behaviors, with the consequent criminal implications. A situation of legal certainty is therefore defined.

The Chart survived, albeit with some difficulty, the judicial period and remained in force in the Spanish and Savoyard era until the enactment of the Code of Carlo Felice in April 1827. From the study of the Chart we can deduce a great attention of the Giudicati towards the protection of the safety of the countryside and agricultural production, including horse breeding and leather production, even to the detriment of sheep farming. This denotes a great attention towards the productive base which supports the efforts of the enemies in the struggle for the independence of Sardinia.

The Condaghes are also of great importance for the study of the judicial period between the 11th and 13th centuries. Term of Byzantine origin (kontakion - stick on which cards sewn together were rolled up) which defines the register on which the parchments of the deeds of donation to monasteries or other ecclesiastical bodies were transcribed. In them the sums of money, the servants, the maids, the cultivated lands, the vineyards, the wooded areas (the salts), the pastures and the livestock donated by the local nobility were reported in great detail. From the Condaghes it was possible to reconstruct a large part of the judicial dynamics known to us as well as being the most ancient evidence of the ancient Sardinian vernacular.

Judicial army
The Sardinian judicial armies were composed of troops made up of soldiers and free citizens, subject to periodic rotation. In an emergency forced conscription was used.

The militias of the ground and the infantry used a shorter version of this same weapon. In Sardinia a type of longbow was made, and over time the use of the crossbow spread.

In case of conflict judges often used mercenary troops, such as the dreaded Genoese crossbowmen.

Culture

Religion

Christianity spread throughout most of the island in the early centuries, excluding much of the Barbagia region. Since Sardinia was in the political sphere of the Byzantine Empire, it developed an array of Greek and Eastern Christianity traits as a result of evangelisation by Basilian monks.

The Sardinian Church was an autocephalous institution for five centuries, independent from both the Byzantine and the Roman Curia. The immigration of monastics to the island was fueled by donated funds, and local churches were built by the judicial aristocracy. However, there were still strong ties with the Eastern liturgy. In 1092 a papal bull expressly abolished the autonomy and autocephaly of the Church of Sardinia, which was placed under the primacy of the Archbishop of Pisa.

The first act of donation was made in 1064 by Barisone I of Torres who gave the Benedictine monks of Monte Cassino a large area of its territory with churches (including the Byzantine church of Nostra Segnora de Mesumundu), not far from the then capital of Ardara. For several centuries afterwards representatives of many religious orders including the monks of the Abbey of Montecassino, the Camaldolese, the Vallombrosians, the Vittorini of Marseille, the Cistercians of Bernard of Clairvaux arrived and settled in Sardinia. As a result of this, Romanesque architecture flourished in the island.

Language
Byzantine Greek was used as an administrative language during the Byzantine period, but fell into disuse. Latin, which had long been the language of the native population, developed into the Sardinian language and became the official language.

Pisan-Genoese and Aragonese interference and end of the four kingdoms

 
From the second half of the thirteenth century the autonomous existence of the kingdoms of Logudoro, Gallura and Calari ended due to the diplomatic maneuvers of Genoa and Pisa on the territory, on trade, on the episcopal curiae, and the judicial chancelleries. The Kingdom of Logudoro ended effectively in 1259 with the direct management of his territories by the Doria and the Malaspina Genoese families. Cagliari was conquered by a Pisan-Sardinian alliance in 1258 and his territory was divided between the winners. Gallura went to the Visconti family and then to Pisa in 1288.

Arborea lasted longer and, between 1323 and 1326, participated in an alliance with the Crown of Aragon at the conquest of the Pisan possessions in Sardinia (the former kingdoms of Gallura and Calari). However, threatened by the Aragonese claims of suzerainty and consolidation of the rest of the island, in 1353 the Kingdom of Arborea, under Marianus IV of Arborea, broke the alliance with the Aragonese and together with the Doria declared war against the Iberians. In 1368 an Arborean offensive succeeded in nearly driving the Aragonese from the island, reducing the Kingdom of Sardinia to just the port cities of Cagliari and Alghero and incorporating everything else into their own kingdom. A peace treaty returned the Aragonese their previous possessions in 1388, but tensions continued. In 1391 the Arborean army, led by Brancaleone Doria, again conquered most of the island, subjecting it to Arborean rule. This state of affairs lasted until 1409, when the army of the Kingdom of Arborea suffered a heavy defeat at the hands of the Aragonese army in the Battle of Sanluri.

The Kingdom of Arborea ceased to exist in 1420, after the sale of its territories to the Aragonese by the last judge, William II of Narbonne, for 100,000 gold florins.

See also
Castles of Sardinia

Notes

Bibliography

English
Dyson, Stephen L., and Rowland, Robert J. Archaeology and History in Sardinia from the Stone Age to the Middle Ages: Shepherds, Sailors, and Conquerors. Philadelphia: University of Pennsyolvania Museum of Archaeology and Anthropology, 2007.
Galoppini, Laura. "Overview of Sardinia History (500–1500)", pp. 85–114. In Michalle Hobart (ed.), A Companion to Sardinian History, 500–1500. Leiden: Brill, 2017.
Puglia, Andrea. "Interactions Between Lay and Ecclesiastical Offices in Sardinia", pp. 319–30. In Frances Andrews and maria Agata Pincelli (eds.), Churchmen and Urban Government in Late Medieval Italy, c.1200–c.1450: Cases and Contexts. Cambridge: Cambridge University Press, 2013.
Rowland, Robert J. The Periphery in the Center: Sardinia in the Ancient and Medieval Worlds. Oxford: Archaeopress, 2001.
Tangheroni, Marco. "Sardinia and Corsica from the Mid-Twelfth to the Early Fourteenth Century", pp. 447–57. In David Abulafia (ed.), The New Cambridge Medieval History, Volume 5: c.1198–c.1300. Cambridge: Cambridge University Press, 1999.
Tangheroni, Marco. "Sardinia and Italy", pp. 237–50. In David Abulafia (ed.), Italy in the Central Middle Ages, 1000–1300. Oxford: Oxford University Press, 2004.
Zedda, Corrado. "A Revision of Sardinian History between the Eleventh and Twelfth Centuries", pp. 115–140. In Michalle Hobart (ed.), A Companion to Sardinian History, 500–1500. Leiden: Brill, 2017.

Italian
 Ortu G.G., La Sardegna dei Giudici, Nuoro, 2005 
 Birocchi I. e Mattone A. (a cura di), La Carta de logu d'Arborea nella storia del diritto medievale e moderno, Roma-Bari, 2004. 
 AA.VV., Storia dei sardi e della Sardegna, II-III Voll., Milano, 1987-89.
 A. Solmi - Studi storici sulle istituzioni della Sardegna nel Medioevo - Cagliari - 1965
 F. C. Casula - La storia di Sardegna - Sassari 1994
 P. Tola - Codice diplomatico della Sardegna - Cagliari - 1986
 E. Besta - La Sardegna medioevale - Palermo - 1954
 Raffaello Delogu, L'architettura del Medioevo in Sardegna, Roma, 1953, ristampa anastatica, Sassari, 1992.
 F. Loddo Canepa - Ricerche e osservazioni sul feudalesimo sardo - Roma 1932
 G. Stefani - Dizionario generale geografico-statistico degli stati sardi - Sassari - Carlo Delfino Editore
 Alberto Boscolo, La Sardegna bizantina e alto giudicale, Cagliari, 1978.
 Alberto Boscolo, La Sardegna dei Giudicati, Cagliari, Edizioni della Torre, 1979.
 A. Solmi - Studi storici sulle istituzioni della Sardegna nel Medioevo - Cagliari - 1917.
 R. Carta Raspi - La costituzione politico sociale della Sardegna - Cagliari - 1937.
 R. Carta Raspi, Storia della Sardegna, Mursia, 1971.
 R. Carta Raspi, Mariano IV D'Arborea, S'Alvure, 2001.
 R. Carta Raspi, Ugone III d'Arborea e le due ambasciate di Luigi D'Anjou, S'Alvure, 1936. 
 M. Caravale - Lo Stato giudicale, questioni ancora aperte, atti del convegno internazionale «Società e Cultura nel Giudicato d'Arborea e nella Carta de Logu» - Oristano - 1995.
 F. C. Casula - Dizionario storico sardo - Sassari - 2003.
 R. Di Tucci - Il diritto pubblico nella Sardegna del Medioevo, in Archivio storico sardo XV - Cagliari - 1924.
 G. Paulis - Studi sul sardo medioevale - Nuoro - Ilisso - 1997.
 Giuseppe Meloni e Andrea Dessì Fulgheri, Mondo rurale e Sardegna del XII secolo, Napoli, Liguori Editore, 1994
 C. Zedda - R. Pinna La nascita dei giudicati. Proposta per lo scioglimento di un enigma storiografico in Archivio storico giuridico sardo di Sassari, seconda serie, volume 12 (2007), pp. 27–118.
 C. Zedda - R. Pinna - La Carta del giudice cagliaritano Orzocco Torchitorio, prova dell'attuazione del progetto gregoriano di riorganizzazione della giurisdizione ecclesiastica della Sardegna, Collana dell'Archivio Storico e Giuridico Sardo di Sassari, nº 10, Sassari 2009.
 C. Zedda – R. Pinna, Fra Santa Igia e il Castro Novo Montis de Castro. La questione giuridica urbanistica a Cagliari all'inizio del XIII secolo, in Archivio Storico e Giuridico Sardo di Sassari, vol. 15 (2010-2011), pp. 125–187.

 
Italian states
10th-century establishments in Europe
15th-century disestablishments in Italy
Medieval Italy